Virginia increased its apportionment from 19 to 22 seats after the 1800 census. Virginia's congressional delegation remained the largest of any state, but would lose this distinction permanently after the Census of 1810. Elections were held over three days in April 1803.

See also 
 United States House of Representatives elections, 1802 and 1803
 List of United States representatives from Virginia

Notes

References 

1803
Virginia
United States House of Representatives